Gomel District, Homieĺski Rajon is a district of Gomel Region, in Belarus.

References

 
Districts of Gomel Region